The Campeonato Internacional de Tênis do Estado do Pará was a tennis tournament held in Belém, Brazil in 2012. The event was part of the ATP Challenger Tour and was played on hard courts.

Past finals

Singles

Doubles

References

External links
Official website

 
ATP Challenger Tour
Clay court tennis tournaments
Recurring sporting events established in 2012
Belém
2012 establishments in Brazil
Tennis tournaments in Brazil